Kingston upon Hull North West was a borough constituency in the city of Kingston upon Hull in East Yorkshire.  It returned one Member of Parliament (MP)  to the House of Commons of the Parliament of the United Kingdom.

The constituency was created for the 1918 general election, and abolished for the 1950 general election.

Boundaries 
The County Borough of Kingston-upon-Hull wards of Albert, Botanic, Newland, and Park.

Members of Parliament

Elections

Elections in the 1910s 

 Ward was issued with the Coalition Coupon but repudiated it.

Elections in the 1920s

Elections in the 1930s

Elections in the 1940s

References 

Parliamentary constituencies in Yorkshire and the Humber (historic)
Constituencies of the Parliament of the United Kingdom established in 1918
Constituencies of the Parliament of the United Kingdom disestablished in 1950
History of Kingston upon Hull